The following list includes all of the Canadian Register of Historic Places listings outside of the City of Vancouver, but still within the Metro Vancouver Regional District of British Columbia.

References

(Individual site references appear in the table above as external links)

Metro Vancouver Regional District
Greater Vancouver